Ronald R. "Ron" Dicklich (June 14, 1951) is an American politician and a construction worker.

Dicklich lived in Hibbing, Minnesota with his wife and family. He received his bachelor's degree in history and political science from the University of Minnesota. Dicklich was a staff member for Minnesota State Representative Tony Sertich and worked for the Minnesota Department of Employment and Economic Development. He served on the St. Louis County Commission and was a Democrat. Dicklich served in the Minnesota Senate from 1981 to 1992.

References

1951 births
Living people
People from Hibbing, Minnesota
University of Minnesota Duluth alumni
County commissioners in Minnesota
Democratic Party Minnesota state senators